Ulotrichopus catocala is a moth of the  family Erebidae. It is found in South Africa, where it has been recorded from the Eastern Cape and KwaZulu-Natal.

References

Endemic moths of South Africa
Moths described in 1874
Ulotrichopus
Moths of Africa